POI SOFT Co., Ltd. is a Japanese game developer and publisher based in Fukuoka, Japan.

The company consists of only four members, and they specialize in developing eShop downloadable games for Nintendo systems such as the Wii, Nintendo 3DS and the Nintendo Switch. The company is known for the Nintendo Switch launch title Vroom in the Night Sky, which received universally negative reviews from critics.

Games developed by Poisoft

Wii (WiiWare)

Nintendo 3DS (eShop)

Nintendo Switch (eShop)

References

Japanese companies established in 2008
Video game companies of Japan
Video game companies established in 2008
Video game development companies
Video game publishers
Companies based in Fukuoka Prefecture